The Treaty of Bucharest (1918) was a peace treaty between Romania and the opposing Central Powers following the stalemate reached after the campaign of 1917. This left Romania isolated after Russia's unilateral exit from World War I (see the Armistice of Focșani and Treaty of Brest-Litovsk).

After long and difficult discussions, which lasted 3 days, and despite the strong opposition of Queen Marie and General Constantin Prezan, the Crown Council decided to accept the ultimatum and send envoys to Buftea to negotiate a preliminary peace treaty.

However, King Ferdinand refused to sign or promulgate it.

Terms
 Romania and the Central Powers declared the end of the state of war between them and that the diplomatic and consular relations between them would be resumed.
 Demobilization of the Romanian forces
 Of Romania's 15 infantry divisions, divisions 11th to 15th were to be disbanded. Of the remaining 10 divisions, the two in Bessarabia were allowed to remain on a war footing, together with the  battalions left over from the disbanded chasseur divisions, as well as the two Romanian cavalry divisions, until the military operations carried out by the Central Powers in Ukraine would eliminate the danger at the Romanian eastern frontier.  The remaining eight divisions would remain on a reduced peace footing: four infantry regiments of three battalions each, two cavalry regiments of two squadrons each, two field artillery regiments of seven batteries each, one battalion of pioneers and the necessary technical troops and convoys. The total force of these eight infantry divisions could not exceed 20,000 men, that of the cavalry 3,200 men and that of the artillery 9,000 men. The divisions in Bessarabia were also to be decreased, in case of demobilization, to the peace footing on the basis of the eight divisions mentioned above.
 The ordnance, machine guns, hand arms, horses, wagons and munitions made available during the reduction or disbanding of the Romanian troops were to be transferred to the high command of the Central Powers' forces and to be guarded by Romanian depot troops. Ammunition left with the Romanian divisions on peace footing was limited to 250 cartridges per musket, 2500 cartridges per machine gun, and 150 shots for each piece of ordnance. The divisions mobilized in Bessarabia were allowed to retain their ammunition needed for the state of war.
 The demobilized troops were to remain in Moldavia until the evacuation of the occupied Romanian territory by the Central Powers, with the exception of the depot troops mentioned at article V. The troops in active service had to secure the permission of the Central Powers' high command if they wanted to pass into the occupied territory.
 Romania and the Central Powers would appoint an officer from their respective General Staff as liaison officer to the other party.
 The Romanian fluvial and maritime forces were allowed to remain intact until the conditions in Bessarabia were cleared up, afterwards they were to be reduced to a peace footing status, except for the fluvial and naval forces needed to protect the commercial navigation and the reestablishment of navigable lanes. The military and naval personnel who in peace time was employed in the ports and in navigation was to be demobilized first, so that they could resume their former activity.
 Cession of Romanian territory
 Romania returned Southern Dobruja (the Cadrilater) and ceded the southern part of Northern Dobruja (see the maps) to Bulgaria. The rest of the province (starting south of Cernavodă-Constanța railroad up to the Danube and the Sfântu Gheorghe branch, thus leaving the Danube Delta to Romania) was ceded by Romania to the Central Powers and thus remained under joint Central Powers' control. The Central Powers guaranteed the commercial road to the Black Sea for Romania by way of Cernavodă and Constanța.
 Romania gave to Austria-Hungary control of the passes of the Carpathian Mountains (see the maps).
 State properties in the territories ceded by Romania passed without indemnity to the acquiring states. The acquiring states were to enter with Romania into agreements over the rights of option and emigration for the Romanian inhabitants in the ceded territories, the apportionment of the properties of the communal districts severed by the new frontiers, the attribution of archives, of judicial, administrative and personal civil records, the management of the new frontiers, the effect of the new frontiers upon the dioceses and the political treaties.
 All parties renounce war indemnities, except for special agreements regarding the regulation of war damages.
 Romania leased its oil wells to Germany for 90 years.
 The Central Powers recognized the Union of Bessarabia with Romania.
 The German and Austrian occupation of Romania was to continue until a date "later to be determined".
 All of the occupation costs were to be paid for by Romania. 
 All of Romania's "surplus" agriculture was to be handed over to Austria-Hungary and Germany with an Austro-German commission deciding what was Romania's "surplus" production and what price to be paid for the "surplus" production.
 All of the railroads, telephones, telegram and post systems in Romania were to remain under the control of Germany and Austria-Hungary.
 German civil servants with the power to veto decisions by Romanian cabinet ministers and to fire Romanian civil servants were appointed to oversee every Romanian ministry, in effect stripping Romania of its independence.

Aftermath
The treaty put Romania in a unique situation compared to other German-occupied countries. It completely respected Romania's de jure independence, and Romania ended up with more territory after the union with Bessarabia, through the requirement that German civil servants with the power of veto power be stationed in Bucharest together with the German occupation to continue until a date "later be determined", effectively turned Romania into a de facto German protectorate.

Germany was able to repair the oil fields around Ploiești and by the end of the war had pumped a million tons of oil. They also requisitioned two million tons of grain from Romanian farmers. These materials were vital in keeping Germany in the war to the end of 1918.

Although Bulgaria received a part of Northern Dobruja, the fact that it could not annex the whole province had a strong effect on the Bulgarian public opinion. Bulgarian Prime Minister Vasil Radoslavov was forced to resign on 20 June 1918 after the failure to acquire the whole Dobruja. Nevertheless, Bulgaria continued to lobby Germany and Austria-Hungary for the annexation of the whole province, including the condominium established by the Treaty of Bucharest. Representatives of Bulgarian Dobrujans held a second general assembly in Babadag on 23 September, adopting a final resolution requesting Dobruja's incorporation into Bulgaria. After negotiations, a protocol regarding the transfer of the jointly administered zone in Northern Dobruja to Bulgaria was signed in Berlin on 24 September 1918, by Germany, Austria-Hungary, the Ottoman Empire and Bulgaria. In return, Bulgaria agreed to cede the left bank of the Maritsa river to Turkey. The protocol was deemed a desperate attempt by the Central Powers to keep Bulgaria on their side during the Vardar Offensive on the Macedonian front. In the end, the agreement was short-lived: five days later, on 29 September, Bulgaria capitulated in the face of the advancing Allied forces (see also the Armistice of Salonica).

The treaty was denounced in October 1918 by the Marghiloman government. Romania re-entered the war on 10 November 1918, the day before it ended in Western Europe, and the 1918 Treaty of Bucharest was nullified by the Armistice of 11 November 1918. In 1919, Germany was forced in the Treaty of Versailles to renounce all the benefits provided by the 1918 Treaty of Bucharest. The territorial transfers to Austria-Hungary and Bulgaria were annulled by the Treaty of Saint-Germain-en-Laye (1919), and the Treaty of Neuilly-sur-Seine (1919), respectively; and the Treaty of Trianon (1920) settled Romania's border with Hungary.

Maps

Image gallery

See also
Romania during World War I
Treaty of Bucharest (1812)
Treaty of Bucharest (1913)
Treaty of Bucharest (1916)

References

External links

Full text of the Treaty of Bucharest 
The Treaty of Bucharest on FirstWorldWar.com
Territory which was ceded to the Austro-Hungarian Empire by Romania following the Treaty of Bucharest, 1918

World War I treaties
Treaties concluded in 1918
1918 in Romania
20th century in Bucharest
Romania in World War I
Territorial evolution of Romania
Austria-Hungary in World War I
Peace treaties of Austria
Peace treaties of Germany
Peace treaties of Romania
Peace treaties of Bulgaria
Peace treaties of the Ottoman Empire
Treaties involving territorial changes
Treaties of the German Empire
Treaties of Austria-Hungary
Treaties of the Kingdom of Romania
Treaties of the Kingdom of Bulgaria
Bulgaria in World War I
Germany–Romania relations
May 1918 events